The Taitung County Museum of Natural History is a museum in Sanxian Village, Chenggong Township, Taitung County, Taiwan.

Architecture
The museum is housed in a 3-story building. The ground floor houses the research archive room and special exhibition room. The upper and topmost floors house the exhibition hall.

Exhibitions
The museum displays marine biological samples from the east coast of Taiwan, mostly shellfish and minerals.

See also
 List of museums in Taiwan

References

Museums in Taitung County